Roy Johan Andreas Johansson (born 5 July 1978) is a Swedish former professional footballer who played as a midfielder. He got his breakthrough with the Swedish team Djurgårdens IF, winning two Allsvenskan championships and two Swedish Cup trophies. He later played for Premier League team Wigan Athletic, before joining AaB with whom he won the Danish Superliga and was named team captain. A full international between 2002 and 2008, he won 16 caps for the Sweden national team.

Club career

Early career 
His career began at Melleruds IF, where he played for three seasons. During this time he played 38 times, scoring 11 goals. It was scoring 10 of these in the final season that prompted Degerfors IF to sign him for the beginning of the 1996 season. Again, he spent three years at the club, regularly securing a place in the team and a modest supply goals. Having moved out of favour with the team at the back end of the 1998 season, he had an unsuccessful spell at AIK, appearing only 12 times in the league, five of these as a sub.

Djurgårdens IF 
In 2000, he moved to Djurgårdens IF, for whom he played until 2004, during which time he saw them claim the Allsvenskan championship in 2002 and 2003, as well as the Swedish Cup in 2002 and 2004. In total he scored 45 goals for Djurgården in 124 appearances.

Wigan Athletic 
He moved to Wigan Athletic at the beginning of calendar year 2005, under manager Paul Jewell. His first appearance in the Wigan team came against Stoke City in February 2005, as a substitute replacement for Gary Teale. This would be his only game of the 2004–05 season. He had a successful 2005–06 Football League Cup, as he scored two extra time goals against Watford and helped Wigan reach the final. He played 16 games during the 2005–06 FA Premier League season, and scored goals against Bolton Wanderers, Tottenham Hotspur (2) and Birmingham City. In the last game of that season, Johansson came on against Arsenal at Highbury and got sent off without touching the ball after tackling fellow country man Freddie Ljungberg in the penalty box, allowing Thierry Henry to score the last goal at the old ground on a penalty kick. He played 12 games during the 2005–06 FA Premier League season, and was released from his Wigan contract in summer 2007 by manager Chris Hutchings.

AaB and OB 
Johansson was quickly snapped up by Danish Superliga club AaB on 17 July 2007. At AaB, he quickly established himself as a playmaking midfielder. With seven goals in 31 games, he led AaB to the 2007–08 Danish Superliga championship, the first AaB championship since 1999. He helped the team reach the group stage of the 2008–09 UEFA Champions League tournament, and scored in the 3–6 defeat to Villarreal CF. AaB finished third in their group, and moved on to the 2008–09 UEFA Cup, where Johansson scored in the aggregate 6–1 defeat of Deportivo La Coruña. He and AaB also reached the 2009 Danish Cup Final, but lost 0–1 to Copenhagen. Following the sale of Thomas Augustinussen, Johansson was named new AaB team captain in July 2009. With eight goals in 32 games he was the AaB top goalscorer of the 2009–10 Danish Superliga season. As his contract expired in the summer 2010, AaB did not have the financial means to extend it.

In June 2010, Johansson signed with Odense Boldklub on a free transfer.

Return to Djurgården and retirement 
He scored his first goal in his second spell for Djurgårdens IF in Allsvenskan on 12 May 2013 in the 3–2 victory against Malmö FF. Johansson retired from professional football after the 2014 Allsvenskan season.

International

Youth 
Johansson started his international career with the Swedish youth selections, including five games for the Sweden national under-21 football team.

Senior 
On 7 September 2002, Johansson made his full international debut for the Sweden national football team in a UEFA Euro 2004 qualifier against Latvia, replacing Magnus Svensson in the 79th minute of a 0–0 draw. He was called up for the Swedish squad at the 2003 King's Cup, and was a part of the national team during spring 2004, playing his 12th national team game. He was not selected for the 2004 European Championship, and was dropped from the national team during his initial time at Wigan. He was once more a part of the Swedish team in the February 2007 game against Egypt, and played his 13th national team game. While at AaB, he was called up for the Swedish squad to replace Freddie Ljungberg in September 2007. He played his 16th and last national team game in January 2008, before he was dropped from the team again. He impressed Swedish manager Lars Lagerbäck in his Champions League games for AaB, and was called up once more in September 2008, but did not play. Johansson's favored position as an offensive central midfielder did not exist in Lagerbäck's rigid 4–4–2 system, and Johansson's international career suffered as a result.

Career statistics

Club

International

Honours
AIK
Svenska Cupen: 1998–99

Djurgården
Allsvenskan: 2002, 2003
Superettan: 2000
Svenska Cupen: 2002, 2004

AaB
Danish Superliga: 2007–08

References

External links

 Career stats @ dr.dk
 AaB profile
 Danish Superliga statistics by Danish Football Association
 Djurgårdens IF statistics at Swedish Football Association

1978 births
Living people
Swedish footballers
Sweden under-21 international footballers
Sweden international footballers
AIK Fotboll players
Djurgårdens IF Fotboll players
Wigan Athletic F.C. players
AaB Fodbold players
Odense Boldklub players
Allsvenskan players
Superettan players
Premier League players
Danish Superliga players
Swedish expatriate footballers
Expatriate men's footballers in Denmark
Expatriate footballers in England
Association football midfielders
Association football forwards
People from Vänersborg Municipality
Sportspeople from Västra Götaland County